Publius Atilius Aebutianus (died 188) was a prefect of the Roman imperial bodyguard, known as the Praetorian Guard, during the reign of emperor Commodus, from 185 until his death in 188. Aebutianus acceded to the office upon the execution of his predecessor Sextus Tigidius Perennis. 

Perennis was removed by the influential freedman and chamberlain of Commodus, Marcus Aurelius Cleander. According to the Historia Augusta, "Commodus Antoninus", Aebutianus was an ally of Lucius Antistius Burrus. So when Pertinax, so it is said, insinuated to the emperor that Burrus and the proconsul of Asia Gaius Arrius Antoninus were plotting to depose him and replace him with Burrus, Aebutianus was accused as a co-conspirator and murdered by Cleander, who then assumed command of the Praetorian Guard himself. In the words of the Historia Augusta, "Then for the first time were there three prefects of the guard, among whom was a freedman, called the "'Bearer of the Dagger'".

References 

2nd-century Romans
188 deaths
Nerva–Antonine dynasty
Ancient Roman murder victims
Praetorian prefects
Year of birth unknown